Monolena is a genus of flowering plants in the family Melastomataceae, consisting of about 15 species distributed from Guatemala to Peru and Acre in Brazil. They are primarily herbs of the wet tropical forest and cloud forest, often growing as epiphytes, but sometimes on rocks within streams.

Accepted species 
 Monolena dressleri R.H. Warner	
 Monolena grandiloba R.H. Warner	
 Monolena guatemalensis Donn. Sm.	
 Monolena morleyi R.H. Warner	
 Monolena multiflora R.H. Warner	
 Monolena panamensis R.H. Warner	
 Monolena primuliflora Hook. f.	
 Monolena trichopoda R.H. Warner

References 
 Genera Plantarum 1: 732, 756. 1867.
 Warner, R. H. 2002. "Systematics of the genus Monolena (Melastomataceae) in Central America". Proc. Calif. Acad. Sci. 53:95-116. 
 The Plant List
 Melastomataceae de Centroamérica

Melastomataceae
Melastomataceae genera
Myrmecophytes
Epiphytes